Nelson Eusebio Semperena González (born February 19, 1984 in Montevideo) is a Uruguayan footballer currently playing for Los Caimanes of the Peruvian Primera División.

Teams
  Defensor Sporting 2002–2007
  Central Español 2008–2010
  Zamora F.C. 2011–2012
  Liverpool 2012–2013
  Huracán 2013–2014
  Los Caimanes 2014–present

Titles
  Defensor Sporting 2006 (Copa Libertadores Playoff)
  Defensor Sporting 2007 (Campeón Torneo Apertura 2007)
  Zamora Futbol Club 2011 (Campeón Torneo Clausura 2011 - Venezuela)

References
 Profile at BDFA 
 
 Profile at Tenfield Digital 

1984 births
Living people
Uruguayan footballers
Uruguayan expatriate footballers
Defensor Sporting players
Central Español players
Zamora FC players
Liverpool F.C. (Montevideo) players
Expatriate footballers in Venezuela
Expatriate footballers in Peru

Association football defenders